The German Church, also called Christinae Church, is church located in the city centre of Gothenburg, Sweden. Named after Queen Christina, it was inaugurated in 1748, and used by the German and Dutch congregation in Gothenburg.

References

External links 

 

Carillons
Churches in Gothenburg
Churches completed in 1748
18th-century Church of Sweden church buildings
Churches in the Diocese of Gothenburg
Christina, Queen of Sweden
Germany–Sweden relations